Cuando me enamoro (English: Timeless Love) is a Mexican telenovela produced by Carlos Moreno Laguillo for Televisa. It is based on the 1998 telenovela La Mentira.

Silvia Navarro and Juan Soler star as the protagonists, while Rocío Banquells, Lisardo and Jessica Coch star as the antagonists.

Univision broadcast Cuando me enamoro from April 20, 2011, to January 6, 2012.

Plot
The story begins with the birth of two daughters; Renata and Roberta, both daughters of Roberto Gamba (Sebastián Rulli) but of different mothers. While Renata is the daughter of Regina Soberón de Gamba (Julieta Rosen), the legitimate wife of Roberto Gamba, Roberta is the daughter of Josefina Álvarez Martínez (Rocío Banquells), Roberto's mistress. When Roberto tells Josefina that he is not going to leave his wife and daughter, Josefina, full of rage, causes Roberto's death by pushing him against a glass door when he was having a heart attack. She decides to kidnap Regina's daughter for revenge and to make Regina suffer. Josefina flees with the two girls and hides in a village while becoming the lover of the municipal president. She changes Regina's name to Renata, leaving Regina shattered and grieving over the loss of her daughter.

Years later, Josefina marries millionaire Gonzalo Monterrubio (René Casados), who adopts her daughters and raises them as if they were his own.

Upon becoming a young woman, Roberta (Jessica Coch) is the girlfriend of Rafael (Sebastián Zurita), an employee of the Gonzalo Monterrubio Corporation. Rafael wants to prove to Roberta that he is capable of providing her with the kind of life she is accustomed to, and thus resigns from the Monterrubio Corporation to become the new owner of a very successful vineyard in Ensenada. But Josefina assassinates Rafael and then makes Roberta believe that Rafael left her. Jerónimo Linares de la Fuente (Juan Soler) is a successful businessman who lives in Spain and decides to travel to Mexico to visit his half-brother, Rafael, and to ask for Roberta's hand in marriage on behalf of his half-brother Rafael.

At the airport, Jerónimo has an encounter with Renata (Silvia Navarro) and is immediately captivated by her beauty. Upon arriving at his brother's ranch and learning of his brother's recent death, Jerónimo is led to believe that a woman whose name begins with the letter "R" is responsible for Rafael's death. Jerónimo swears to avenge his brother's death by seducing, marrying, and subsequently making life unbearable for the woman his brother nicknamed "La Bonita".

At first, Jerónimo suspects that "La Bonita" is in reality Roberta; however, through a series of misunderstandings, together with the deceitful plotting and conniving of Josefina, Jerónimo is pointed in the direction of Renata as "La Bonita". Destiny and time will prove him wrong, but in the meantime he will lose Renata's love due to his deception and lies. When Renata finds out the truth she leaves the ranch. When time passes Renata and Jerónimo get back together. When Renata was going to get married with Jerónimo again she found out she was pregnant. When it was time for the wedding Jerónimo went missing. Renata thought he left her but when she found out he had been kidnapped. When they found Jeronimo, Renata went to Ensenada when she was on her way she got kidnapped by Agustin Dunant. Jeronimo got better and they started looking for her. Renata was on Agustin Dunant's ship "El Renacer". Jeronimo makes it on board and battles Agustin in a sword fight. Jeronimo manages to defeat Agustin, who dies, and he and Renata lived happy with their five children – three girls and two boys.

Cast

Main

 Silvia Navarro as Renata Monterrubio Álvarez de Linares/Regina Gamba Soberón
 Juan Soler as Jerónimo Linares de la Fuente
 Rocío Banquells as Josefina "Fina" Álvarez Martínez de Monterrubio (main villain, ends up insane)
 René Casados as Gonzalo Monterrubio
 Julieta Rosen as Regina Soberón Vda. de Gamba

Also main

 Guillermo Capetillo as Antonio Iriondo
 Alfredo Adame as Honorio Sánchez
 Martha Julia as Marina Sepúlveda 
 Lourdes Munguía as Constanza Monterrubio de Sánchez
 Lisardo as Agustín Dunant (villain, killed by Jeronimo)
 Jessica Coch as Roberta Monterrubio Álvarez / Roberta Gamba Álvarez (villain, finally turns good, accidentally killed by Josefina)
 José Ron as Matías Monterrubio
 Odiseo Bichir as Álvaro Nesme
 Luis Gatica as Lázaro López
 Yolanda Ventura as Karina Aguilar de Nesme
 Grettell Valdéz as Matilde López
 Aleida Núñez as Alfonsina Campos Flores de Fierro
 Carlos de la Mota as Carlos Estrada
 Ferdinando Valencia as José María "Chema" Casillas 
 Alejandro Ruiz as Ezequiel Fierro
 Wendy González as Adriana Sánchez Beltrán #1
 Florencia del Saracho as Adriana Sánchez Beltrán #2
 Magda Karina as Blanca Ocampo/ Maritza Del Rio
 Eleazar Gómez as Aníbal Cuevas
 Julio Mannino as Saúl Guardiola
 
Sachi Tamashiro as Eulalia

Recurring cast

 Irma Dorantes as Catalina Vda. de Soberón
 Olivia Bucio as Inés Fonseca de Del Valle
 Antonio Medellín as Isidro Del Valle
 Zoraida Gómez as Julieta Montiel
 Ilithya Manzanilla as Arely 
 Marco Uriel as Comandante Cantú
 David Ostrosky as Benjamín Casillas
 Hugo Macías Macotela as Padre Severino
 Geraldine Galván as Alisson Contreras
 Michelle Ramaglia as Priscila
 Jackie Garcia as Selene Carrasco
 Jesús More as Diego Lara
 Vanessa Mateo as Lorea 
 Pablo Cruz Guerrero as Daniel
 Yoselin Sánchez as Beth Arteaga
 Luis Reynoso as Leoncio Pérez
 Jorge Alberto Bolaños as Lic. Ramiro Soto
 Aldo Fabila as Manriquez
 Sara Monar as Gema de Ibarrola
 Sussan Taunton as Luciana Peniche
 Marco Munoz as Germán Ibarrola
 Yolanda Mérida as Manuela
 Raquel Morell as Ágatha Beltrán

Special participation

 Sebastián Zurita as Rafael Gutiérrez de la Fuente
 Sebastián Rulli as Roberto Gamba 
 Lidia Ávila as Regina Soberón de Gamba (Young)
 Margarita Magaña as Josefina "Pepa" Álvarez Martínez (Young)
 Silvia Manríquez as Catalina vda de Soberón (Young)
 Juan Ángel Esparza as Isidro Del Valle (Young)
 Jorge de Silva as Gonzalo Monterrubio (Young)
 Susana Diazayas as Inés Fonseca de Del Valle (Young)
 Mario Carballido as Honorio Sánchez (Young)
 Mariney Sendra as Constanza Monterrubio de Sánchez (Young)
 Araceli Rangel as Ágatha Beltrán (Young)
Arturo Peniche as Juan Cristóbal Gamboa Martelli

Awards and nominations

References

External links

2010 telenovelas
2010 Mexican television series debuts
2011 Mexican television series endings
Mexican telenovelas
Televisa telenovelas
Spanish-language telenovelas